Qədirli or Kadyrly may refer to:
Qədirli, Masally, Azerbaijan
Qədirli, Tovuz, Azerbaijan